Diego Seoane may refer to:

Diego Seoane (Spanish footballer) (born 1988)
Diego Seoane (Uruguayan footballer) (born 1976)